Arkadiusz Litwiński (born 31 July 1970) is a Polish politician. He was elected to the Sejm on 25 September 2005, getting 7794 votes in 41 Szczecin district as a candidate from the Civic Platform list.

See also
Members of Polish Sejm 2005-2007

External links
Arkadiusz Litwiński - parliamentary page - includes declarations of interest, voting record, and transcripts of speeches.

1970 births
Living people
Politicians from Szczecin
Members of the Polish Sejm 2005–2007
Civic Platform politicians
Members of the Polish Sejm 2007–2011
Members of the Polish Sejm 2011–2015